The Lăpuș is a right tributary of the river Someș in Romania. It originates in the Lăpuș Mountains, Maramureș County. It discharges into the Someș in Bușag, west of Baia Mare. It flows through the communes Băiuț, Lăpuș, Târgu Lăpuș, Vima Mică, Șomcuta Mare, Remetea Chioarului, Coaș, Săcălășeni, Groși, Coltău, Recea and Tăuții-Măgherăuș.

Tributaries

The following rivers are tributaries to the river Lăpuș (from source to mouth):

Left: Tocila, Botiz, Râoaia, Iedera, Suciu, Nireș, Rohia, Valea Mare, Valea Gâdelui, Boiul, Prislop
Right: Strâmbul Băiuț, Rotunda, Dobric, Valea Rea, Cavnic, Chechiș, Craica, Săsar, Băița

References

Rivers of Romania
Rivers of Maramureș County